Hun Manith (born 17 October 1981) is a brigadier general in the Royal Cambodian Armed Forces (RCAF) and the fourth child of Prime Minister Hun Sen. His older brother, Hun Manet, is a four star general in the RCAF. He is currently deputy chief of the Defence Ministry's Intelligence Department. He is married to Hok Chendavy, the daughter of former National Police Commissioner Hok Lundy.

References

1981 births
Living people
Cambodian Buddhists
Cambodian military personnel
Cambodian People's Party politicians
Cambodian people of Chinese descent 
Children of prime ministers of Cambodia
Children of national leaders 
People from Phnom Penh 
Hun family
Hun Sen